Chandran Nair is a Singaporean poet and retired Director and Mediator of UNESCO in Paris.

Biography

Background
Nair was born in Kerala, India in 1945. He left India for Singapore at the age of seven. His father, Villayil Raman Gopala Pillai who wrote short stories and novels in Malayalam under the pen name of Njekkad had migrated to Singapore in 1947.
In 1973 Chandran Nair married Ivy Goh Pek Kien.

He studied at Raffles Institution and University of Singapore from which he holds a Masters in Science (Marine Biology) and a Diploma in Fisheries (with distinction) but went into publishing on his graduation and worked as an international civil servant with UNESCO, first in Karachi (1981-1985), where he started painting, and then in Paris (1985 - 2004), where he now lives.

Career
Nair started writing at an early age and his first poems were published in his school magazine The Rafflesian in 1963. His first book of poems, Once The Horsemen and Other Poems, (University Education Press, Singapore), was published in 1972 and was well received as was his second collection After the Hard Hours, This Rain,(Woodrose Publications, Singapore) (1975), and he has co-translated with Malcolm Koh Ho Ping "The Poems and Lyrics of the last Lord Lee, the last Emperor of the Southern Tang Dynasty", (Woodrose Publications, Singapore) (1975). He won The New Nation Singapore Short Story Writing contest in 1973 and has published his stories in "Short Stories From Africa and Asia" (which he co-edited with Theo Luzuka), "Singapore Writing", 1977, which he edited for the Society of Singapore Writers," Singapore Short Stories (Vol. 1)" edited by Robert Yeo and also in translation in Malay in "Cerpen Cerpen Asean"(Dewan Bahasa dan Pustaka).
 
He was founder President of the Society of Singapore Writers from 1976 to 1981.

Since moving to the Paris he has continued painting and writing but has not published, though he has been included in a number of anthologies including "Calling of the Kindred" (Cambridge Universities Press, 1993), and has been featured in "Reworlding" :an anthology reviewing the writing of expatriate Indians, edited by Emmanuel S Nelson (Greenwood Press, New York, 1992). He is also included in "Idea to Ideal", FirstFruits, Singapore 2004 - 12 Singapore poets on the writing of their poems(edited by Felix Cheong) and in "Journeys : An Anthology of Singapore Poetry" edited by Edwin Thumboo, 1995.

His poem "Grandfather" has been used by the University of Cambridge International Examinations Board for their examination papers.

Nair is perhaps the only Singaporean poet cited in Parliament. In a discussion about the multiracial nature of modern Singapore, Dr Chiang Hai Ding (MP for Ulu Pandan) had this to say:

Where else but in Singapore can we find an ethnic Indian, born in India, educated in Singapore, possessing a Science degree from the University of Singapore (a master's degree in Marine Biology) and writing beautiful love poems to his ethnic Chinese wife in an English language magazine? I do not propose to read out his poems today but, in view of the forthcoming visit of our foreign minister to Peking, perhaps Mr Speaker and hon. Members will bear with me if I read three lines:

To the east where there is sunshine 
The Mind must turn for the beginning
of the World, in which only love matters

(Chandran Nair, Her World, February 1975, p. 27)

Reviews

Nair's poetry has been commented upon by local as well as foreign reviewers.  Below are some of these comments.

Ban Kah Choon on "Once the Horsemen and Other Poems":
". . . But this is an important book of poems.  Its themes are human ones, its scenes those we can recognize, its mythology ours.  And Mr Nair handles it all adroitly. Many foreigners sneer at local poetry, talking of its lack of skill (as if that is the only thing that matters) and residing in the weather-beaten towers of Eliot, Yeats and Dylan Thomas.  For them, I offer Mr Nair's volume of poems.  It should be interesting to see his future development.  We have a strong and unafraid voice among us."

Kirpal Singh in "Staying Close but Breaking free: Indian writers in Singapore":
. . . of all the Indians writing in English in Singapore, it is Chandran Nair, I believe, who may be said to be the most "Indian" in terms of literary expression. His two collections of poetry, "Once the Horsemen and other Poems (1972)" and "After the Hard Hours this Rain (1975)", reveal fairly explicit references to Indian myths, legends, landscape and spirituality.  In an early poem (Grandfather) written for his grandfather, Nair clearly registers the Indian nostalgia felt deeply in contemplation.  The poem is suggestive also of the position Nair himself seems to have adopted in relation to living in an environment which does not always appreciate the commitment of becoming a sensitive soul.(Reworlding: The Literature of the Indian Diaspora, edited by Emmanuel S Nelson.)

Hariharan Poonjar in "Malayali Rebel in Singapore":
". . . Chandran is no juggler of words.  He dives to the existential core of an experience and describes it without ornamentation and verbal fat.  The basic struggle of a psyche responding to the pressures of an intense search for a personality that is rooted in the present—in one's own present—bristles in each line written by this promising poet.
Nirmala D Govindasamy in "Chandran Nair: An Appraisal":
". . . Chandran Nair is obviously a master of words.  His acuteness of observation and accuracy of detail when it comes to metaphorical allusions are admirable.  Even if one is dissatisfied with his handling of themes, his handling of words distinguishes him as a skilled craftsman."
Nallama Jenstad on "Once the Horsemen and Other Poems":
". . . Chandran Nair's poetry is good—amazingly good. First, even from a purely sociological point of view, one sees through his imagery all the varied influences of this Malaysian/Singaporean Indian and watches as the influences struggle to form, not a "Revolving Man" but a real "person".  One sees the background of Hinduism work side by side with Christianity, one watches the Chinese/Malay and "other" influences on his Indianness, from page to page and from poem to poem.  It is very interesting reading—but even more, it is so forcefully well-written."

Edwin Thumboo in his "Introduction to the Second Tongue":
. . . Much of Chandran Nair's poetry is exploration. "Once the Horsemen" (1972) communicates the variety of Nair's poetic world and the note of urgency with which he attempts his themes.  Image and metaphor abound and are part and parcel of "the wrestle with experience".  For the raid into the articulate to achieve what Shelley called "new materials of knowledge" amounts to an essential self-understanding to harmonise the ways to thought and feeling.  By taking many themes as grist for his maw, Nair's poetry ranges over the feelings of a Hindu bride to the Roman Emperor, Caligula.  The simultaneous forays into life and language and the myths and legends of East and West, have strengthened and extended the coordinating power of Nair's idiom.

Ban Kah Choon on "After the Hard Hours this Rain":
. . . For those of us who remember Chandran Nair's first book of poems (Once the Horsemen, 1972), impressed with its versatility and hard brilliance of style, a second offering of poems from any poet is another matter. . . we are worried about the poet's development, we search for those unhealthy signs that indicate a falling into the cliched and routined. . . If we are inclined to such ungenerous thought, Chandran Nair's new volume, "After the Hard Hours this Rain" sets our minds at ease.  Our poet is as articulately tough as ever. . .

Works

Poetry collections 
 Once the Horsemen and Other Poems (1972, University Education Press)
 After the Hard Hours, This Rain (1975, Woodrose Publications)
 Reaching for Stones: Collected Poems (1963-2009) (2010, Ethos Books)

Anthologies (editor) 
 Singapore Writing (1977, Woodrose Publications for the Society of Singapore Writers)
 Short Stories from Africa and Asia (co-editor; 1976, Woodrose Publications)

Non-Fiction 
 Book Promotion, Sales and Distribution, Management Training Course (1987)

Translations 
 The Poems & Lyrics of Last Lord Lee: A Translation (co-translator; 1975, Woodrose Publications)

Awards 
 New Nation Short Story Contest, First Prize for Leta, 1973
 University of Singapore Students' Union Silver Medal for Outstanding Work, 1969

See also
List of Nairs

Notes

References 

Nair Just Can't Stop Writing Singapore New Nation, 3 July 1973
Review of Short Stories from Africa & Asia by K'o Tsung Yuen, New Nation, 21 February 1974
Weekender Profile:Chandran Nair The Sunday Times, Singapore, 25 Nov 1979
The High Cost of Publishing a Book Interview:Chandran Nair, Singapore New Nation, 16 December 1974
Penulis Undangan: Chandran Nair Berita Harian, Jumaat 12 Mac,1976
Back efforts of local writers call Singapore New Nation, 8 Jun 1976
Why foreign books only? Singapore New Nation, 5 Jul 1975
Love Poems of Chandran Nair Her World Magazine, Singapore, February 1975
Reworlding edited by Emmanuel S Nelson, Greenwood Press, NY 1992, 
The Calling of the Kindred edited by A Barlow 1993, Cambridge Uni Press, 
Idea to Ideal edited by Felix Cheong 2004, Firstfruits, Singapore, 
Literary Encyclopedia
Singapore Literature

External links 
Website
Frankfurt Book Fair

Nair, Chandran
Nair, Chandran
Nair, Chandran
Nair, Chandran
Singaporean people of Malayali descent
Nair, Chandran
Nair, Chandran
Nair, Chandran
Raffles Institution alumni